Underwater vision is the ability to see objects underwater, and this is significantly affected by several factors. Underwater, objects are less visible because of lower levels of natural illumination caused by rapid attenuation of light with distance passed through the water. They are also blurred by scattering of light between the object and the viewer, also resulting in lower contrast. These effects vary with wavelength of the light, and color and turbidity of the water. The vertebrate eye is usually either optimised for underwater vision or air vision, as is the case in the human eye. The visual acuity of the air-optimised eye is severely adversely affected by the difference in refractive index between air and water when immersed in direct contact. Provision of an airspace between the cornea and the water can compensate, but has the side effect of scale and distance distortion. The diver learns to compensate for these distortions. Artificial illumination is effective to improve illumination at short range.

Stereoscopic acuity, the ability to judge relative distances of different objects, is considerably reduced underwater, and this is affected by the field of vision. A narrow field of vision caused by a small viewport in a helmet results in greatly reduced stereoacuity, and associated loss of hand-eye coordination. At very short range in clear water distance is underestimated, in accordance with magnification due to refraction through the flat lens of the mask, but at greater distances - greater than arm's reach, the distance tends to be overestimated to a degree influenced by turbidity. Both relative and absolute depth perception are reduced underwater. Loss of contrast results in overestimation, and magnification effects account for underestimation at short range. Divers can to a large extent adapt to these effects over time and with practice.

Light rays bend when they travel from one medium to another; the amount of bending is determined by the refractive indices of the two media. If one medium has a particular curved shape, it functions as a lens. The cornea, humours, and crystalline lens of the eye together form a lens that focuses images on the retina. The human eye is adapted for viewing in air. Water, however, has approximately the same refractive index as the cornea (both about 1.33), effectively eliminating the cornea's focusing properties. When immersed in water, instead of focusing images on the retina, they are focused  behind the retina, resulting in an extremely blurred image from hypermetropia. This is largely avoided by having an air space between the water and the cornea, trapped inside the mask or helmet.

Water attenuates light due to absorption and as light passes through water colour is selectively absorbed by the water. Color absorption is also affected by turbidity of the water and dissolved material. Water preferentially absorbs red light, and to a lesser extent, yellow, green and violet light, so the color that is least absorbed by water is blue light. Particulates and dissolved materials may absorb different frequencies, and this will affect the color at depth, with results such as the typically green color in many coastal waters, and the dark red-brown color of many freshwater rivers and lakes due to dissolved organic matter.

Visibility is a term which generally predicts the ability of some human or instrument to optically detect an object in the given environment, and may be expressed as a measure of the distance at which an object or light can be discerned. Factors affecting visibility include illumination, length of the light path, particles which cause scattering, dissolved pigments which absorb specific colours,  and salinity and temperature gradients which affect refractive index.Visibility can be measured in any arbitrary direction, and for various colour targets, but horizontal visibility of a black target reduces the variables and meets the requirements for a straight-forward and robust parameter for underwater visibility. Instruments are available for field estimates of visibility from the surface, which can inform the dive team on probable complications.

Focus 
Water has a significantly different refractive index to air, and this affects the focusing of the eye. Most animals' eyes are adapted to either underwater or air vision, and do not focus properly when in the other environment.

Fish 
The crystalline lenses of fishes' eyes are extremely convex, almost spherical, and their refractive indices are the highest of all the animals. These properties enable proper focusing of the light rays and in turn proper image formation on the retina. This convex lens gives the name to the fisheye lens in photography.

Humans 

By wearing a flat diving mask, humans can see clearly underwater. The mask's flat window separates the eyes from the surrounding water by a layer of air. Light rays entering from water into the flat parallel window change their direction minimally within the window material itself. But when these rays exit the window into the air space between the flat window and the eye, the refraction is quite noticeable. The view paths refract (bend) in a manner similar to viewing fish kept in an aquarium. Linear polarizing filters decrease visibility underwater by limiting ambient light and dimming artificial light sources.

While wearing a flat scuba mask or goggles, objects underwater will appear 33% bigger (34% bigger in salt water) and 25% closer than they actually are. Also pincushion distortion and lateral chromatic aberration are noticeable. Double-dome masks restore natural sized underwater vision and field of view, with certain limitations.

Diving masks can be fitted with lenses for divers needing optical correction to improve vision. Corrective lenses are ground flat on one side and optically cemented to the inside face of the mask lens. This provides the same amount of correction above and below the surface of the water. Bifocal lenses are also available for this application. Some masks are made with removable lenses, and a range of standard corrective lenses are available which can be fitted. Plastic self-adhesive lenses that can be applied to the inside of the mask may fall off if the mask is flooded for a significant period. Contact lenses may be worn under a mask or helmet, but there is some risk of losing them if the mask floods.

Physiological variations 
A very near-sighted person can see more or less normally underwater . Scuba divers with interest in underwater photography may notice presbyopic changes while diving before they recognize the symptoms in their normal routines due to the near focus in low light conditions.

The Moken people of South-East Asia are able to focus underwater to pick up tiny shellfish and other food items. Gislén et al. have compared Moken and untrained European children and found that the underwater visual acuity of the Moken was twice that of their untrained European counterparts.  European children after 1 month of training also showed the same level of underwater visual acuity.
This is due to the contraction of the pupil, instead of the usual dilation (mydriasis) that is undergone when a normal, untrained eye, accustomed to viewing in air, is submerged.

Color vision 

Water attenuates light due to absorption which varies as a function of frequency. In other words, as light passes through a greater distance of water color is selectively absorbed by the water. Color absorption is also affected by turbidity of the water and dissolved material.

Water preferentially absorbs red light, and to a lesser extent, yellow, green and violet light, so the color that is least absorbed by water is blue light. Particulates and dissolved materials may absorb different frequencies, and this will affect the color at depth, with results such as the typically green color in many coastal waters, and the dark red-brown color of many freshwater rivers and lakes due to dissolved organic matter.

Fluorescent paints absorb higher frequency light to which the human eye is relatively insensitive and emit lower frequencies, which are more easily detected. The emitted light and the reflected light combine and may be considerably more visible than the original light. The most visible frequencies are also those most rapidly attenuated in water, so the effect is for greatly increased colour contrast over a short range, until the longer wavelengths are attenuated by the water.

The best colors to use for visibility in water was shown by Luria et al. and quoted from Adolfson and Berghage below:

A. For murky, turbid water of low visibility (rivers, harbors, etc.)
1. With natural illumination:
a. Fluorescent yellow, orange, and red.
b. Regular yellow, orange, and white.
2. With incandescent illumination:
a. Fluorescent and regular yellow, orange, red and white.
3. With a mercury light source:
a. Fluorescent yellow-green and yellow-orange.
b. Regular yellow and white.

B. For moderately turbid water (sounds, bays, coastal water).
1. With natural illumination or incandescent light source:
a. Any fluorescent in the yellows, oranges, and reds.
b. Regular yellow, orange, and white.
2. With a mercury light source:
a. Fluorescent yellow-green and yellow-orange.
b. Regular yellow and white.

C. For clear water (southern water, deep water offshore, etc.).
1. With any type of illumination fluorescent paints are superior.
a. With long viewing distances, fluorescent green and yellow-green.
b. With short viewing distances, fluorescent orange is excellent.
2. With natural illumination:
a. Fluorescent paints.
b. Regular yellow, orange, and white.
3. With incandescent light source:
a. Fluorescent paints.
b. Regular yellow, orange, and white.
4. With a mercury light source:
a. Fluorescent paints.
b. Regular yellow, white.

The most difficult colors at the limits of visibility with a water background are dark colors such as gray or black.

Visibility 

Visibility is a term which generally predicts the ability of some human or instrument to detect an object in the given environment, and may be expressed as a measure of the distance at which an object or light can be discerned. The theoretical black body visibility of pure water based on the values for the optical properties of water for light of 550 nm has been estimated at 74 m. For the case of a relatively large object, sufficiently illuminated by daylight, the horizontal visibility of the object is a function of the photopic beam attenuation coefficient (spectral sensitivity of the eye). This function has been reported as 4.6 divided by the photopic beam attenuation coefficient.

Factors affecting visibility include: particles in the water (turbidity), salinity gradients (haloclines), temperature gradients (thermoclines) and dissolved organic matter.

Reduction of contrast with distance in a horizontal plane at a specific wavelength has been found to depend directly on the beam attenuation coefficient for that wavelength. The inherent contrast of a black target is -1, so the visibility of a black target in the horizontal direction depends on a single parameter,which is not the case for any other colour or direction, making horizontal visibility of a black target the simplest case, and for this reason it has been proposed as a standard for underwater visibility, as it can be measured with reasonably simple instrumentation. 

The photopic beam attenuation coefficient, on which diver visibility depends, is the attenuation of natural light as perceived by the human eye, but in practice it is simpler and more usual to measure the attenuation coefficient for one or more wavelength bands. It has been shown that the function 4.8 divided by the photopic beam attenuation coefficient, as derived by Davies-Colley, gives a value for visibility with an average error of less than 10% for a large range of typical coastal and inland water conditions and viewing conditions, and the beam attenuation coefficients for a single wavelength band at about 530nm peak is a suitable proxy for the full visible spectrum for many practical purposes with some small adjustments.

Measurement of visibility
The standard measurement for underwater visibility is the distance at which a Secchi disc can be seen.
The range of underwater vision is usually limited by turbidity. In very clear water visibility may extend as far as about 80m, and a record Secchi depth of 79 m has been reported from a coastal polynya of the Eastern Weddell Sea, Antarctica. In other sea waters, Secchi depths in the 50 to 70 m range have occasionally been recorded, including a 1985 record of 53 m in the Eastern  and up to 62 m in the tropical Pacific Ocean. This level of visibility is seldom found in surface freshwater. Crater Lake, Oregon, is often cited for clarity, but the maximum recorded Secchi depth using a 2 m disc is 44 m. The lakes of the McMurdo Dry Valleys of Antarctica and Silfra in Iceland have also been reported as exceptionally clear.

Visibility can be measured in an arbitrary direction, and of various colour targets, but horizontal visibility of a black target reduces the variables and meets the requirements for a straight-forward and robust parameter for underwater visibility, which can be used to make operational decisions for mine hunters and explosive ordnance disposal teams.

An instrument for measuring underwater visibility basically measures light transmission through the water between the target and the observer, to calculate the loss, and is called a transmissometer. By measuring the amount of light which is transmitted from a light source of known strength and wavelength distribution, through a known distance of water to a calibrated light meter, the clarity of water can be objectively quantified. A wavelength of 532 nm (green) aligns well with the peak of the human visual perception spectrum, but other wavelengths may be used. Transmissometers are more sensitive at low particulate concentration and are better suited for measuring relatively clear water.

Measurement of turbidity

Nephelometers are used for measuring suspended particles in turbid waters where they have a more linear response than transmissometers. Turbidity, or cloudiness, of water is a relative measure. It is an apparent optical property which varies depending on the properties of the suspended particles, illumination, and instrument characteristics. Turbidity is measured in nephelometer units referenced to a turbidity standard or in Formazin Turbidity Units.

Nephelometers measure the light scattered by suspended particles and respond mainly to the first-order effects of particle size and concentration. Depending on manufacturer, nephelometers measure scattered light in the range between about 90° to 165° off the axis of the beam, and usually use infra-red light with a wavelength of around 660 nm because this wavelength is rapidly absorbed by water, so there is very little contamination of the source due to ambient daylight except near to the surface.

Low visibility 
Low visibility is defined by NOAA for operational purposes as: "When visual contact with the dive buddy can no longer be maintained."

DAN-Southern Africa suggest that limited visibility is when a "buddy cannot be discerned at a distance greater than 3 metres."

See also

References

Further reading 
 

Vision
Underwater diving physics